Acemannan is a D-isomer mucopolysaccharide in aloe vera leaves. This compound has potential immunostimulant, antiviral, antineoplastic, and gastrointestinal properties.

Chemical structure and properties 
Acemannan's monomer is mannoacetate linked by β-1,4-glycosidic bonds. This polymer is hydrophilic.

Immunostimulant properties 
Acemannan has been demonstrated to induce macrophages to secrete interferon (IFN), tumor necrosis factor-α (TNF-α) and interleukins (IL-1); therefore, it might help to prevent or abrogate viral infection. These three cytokines are known to cause inflammation, and interferon is released in response to viral infections. In vitro studies have shown acemannan to inhibit HIV replication; however, in vivo studies have been inconclusive.

Acemannan is currently being used for treatment and clinical management of fibrosarcoma in dogs and cats. Administration of acemannan has been shown to increase tumor necrosis and prolonged host survival; the animals have demonstrated lymphoid infiltration and encapsulation.

References 

Aloe
Adjuvants
Botanical drugs
Polysaccharides